Edward "Ted" Jackson (16 March 1925 – 5 February 1996) was an Australian rules football player in the Victorian Football League (VFL). Edwards was one of few league players of Indigenous Australian heritage in the 1940s.

At the end of the 1947, "Clubman", the Weekly Times football correspondent rated ex-Echuca Melbourne player, Eddie Jackson, the best of all of the first-year "former country players" in that year's VFL Competition: the second-best was the ex-Wycheproof Collingwood player, Alex Denney, and the third-best was the ex-Granya Footscray player, Norm Webb.

He played in the Melbourne team in the 1948 Grand Final.

Jackson won the 1954 Bendigo Football League best and fairest award, the Michelsen Medal after he returned to play with Echuca.

References

External links

Eddie Jackson profile at Demonwiki

Melbourne Football Club players
1925 births
1996 deaths
Indigenous Australian players of Australian rules football
Echuca Football Club players
Australian rules footballers from Victoria (Australia)
Melbourne Football Club Premiership players
One-time VFL/AFL Premiership players